Almami (Also: Almamy, Almaami) was the regnal name of  Tukulor monarchs from the eighteenth century through the first half of the twentieth century. It is derived from the Arabic Al-Imam, meaning "the leader", and it has since been claimed as the title of rulers in other West African theocratic monarchies.

Famous holders of the title
Ibrahim Sori, Imamate of Futa Jallon.
Karamokho Alfa, Imamate of Futa Jallon
Bokar Biro, Imamate of Futa Jallon
Almamy Ahmadou of Timbo
Almany Niamody of the Toucouleur vassal state of Kaarta.
Samori Ture of the Wassoulou Empire.
Maba Diakhou Bâ, almamy of Rip in the Saloum region of Senegal.

Places
Almami Rural LLG in Papua New Guinea

Proper name
In recent times the word has become a proper name in some areas of West Africa in honor of the historical figures known by the title.  
Malian independence leader Almamy Sylla and Guinean football player Almamy Schuman Bah are examples.

References

B. A. Ogot(ed). Africa from the Sixteenth to the Eighteenth Century. UNESCO General History of Africa (1999) 
"almamy: (title  In Futa Bundu,  Futa Jallon, Futa Toro and the Sokoto Caliphate): a Fulfulde version of the title imam."

18th century in Africa
19th century in Africa
Titles